Kim Jong-hyeok (born 31 March 1983) is a South Korean football referee who has been a full international referee for FIFA.

Kim became a FIFA referee in 2009. He also refereed in 2014 FIFA World Cup qualifiers, beginning with the opening-round match between Mongolia and Myanmar.

References 

1983 births
Living people
South Korean football referees
AFC Asian Cup referees